Tympanopleura brevis is a species of driftwood catfish of the family Auchenipteridae. It can be found on the Amazon basin.

References

Fish described in 1881
Freshwater fish of Brazil
Taxa named by Franz Steindachner